The 1964 World Sportscar Championship season was the 12th season of FIA 'World Sportscar Championship' motor racing. Titles were awarded in three engine capacity divisions:
 Division I – Under 1300cc
 Division II – Under 2000cc
 Division III – Over 2000cc

The season also included the 1964 International Prototype Trophy which was open to Prototype cars and was contested over four of the twenty championship races. Titles were awarded to those that were:
 Outright
 Under 3000cc

Schedule
The twenty championship races each counted towards one or more of the five FIA Titles, as shown below. A points coefficient multiplication factor was applied for each race to the determine the number of championship points to be awarded.

Points system

International Championship for GT Manufacturers
 Points were awarded to the top six positions in each division in each race on a 9-6-4-3-2-1 basis with the relevant points coefficient applied (see Schedule above). 
 Points were awarded only for the position gained by the best placed car from each manufacturer in each division at each race.
 Only the best six race results plus one hillclimb result were retained towards the final classification.
 Manufacturers had to enter at least six races and one hillclimb to be eligible for championship classification.

International Prototypes Trophy
 Points were awarded to the top six positions outright and in the Under 3000cc division in each race on a 9-6-4-3-2-1 basis with the relevant points coefficient applied (see Schedule above).
 Points were awarded only for the position gained by the best placed car from each manufacturer at each race.
 All points were retained towards the final classification.
 Manufacturers had to enter all four Trophy races to be eligible for championship classification.

Results

International Championship for GT Manufacturers

Division I (1300 cc)

Division II (2000 cc)

Division III (+2000 cc)

Note: Some manufacturers (other than the three Division winners) may have been ineligible for championship classification under the minimum race participation regulation.

International Prototypes Trophy

Note: 
 Ferrari scored 46.8 points but was deemed ineligible for classification as it had not contested the Prototype category at all four races.
 Iso, MG & Chevrolet also scored points but were ineligible for classification for the same reason.

- 3000 cc

Note:
 MG, Rene Bonnet, Triumph, Diva, Martini & Volvo all scored points but were deemed ineligible for classification as they had not contested the Prototype category at all four races.

References

External links
 Championship points tables at wspr-racing.com
 1964 Championship race results at wspr-racing.com
 1964 Championship points tables & race results at www.teamdan.com
 Championship race results & images at www.racingsportscars.com

World Sportscar Championship seasons
World Sportscar Championship